Kairosoft (カイロソフト - Kairo sofuto) is a Japanese video game developer located in Tokyo, Japan that has created a number of simulation games for cell phones, PCs and Nintendo Switch. Founded in 1996, the company has developed a number of mobile games for the Japanese market and has found great success in porting them to the modern iOS and Android operating systems. The company was ranked 30th in Pocket Gamers "top 50 developers of 2012" list.

History
Kairosoft was founded as a dōjin games developer in 1996, and is currently located in the Nishi-Shinjuku district of Tokyo with only nine employees. They started out developing simulation games for the Windows platform, the first of which was released in 1996 and simulated a used bookstore, and another example was the original Game Dev Story released in 1997, with a sequel released in 2001. In 2001, Kairosoft switched to developing mobile simulation games for the Japanese cell phone market, which was much more developed than America's. The company was incorporated in September 2007, and launched a new website on November 4, 2008.

With the release of Game Dev Story for iOS and Android in 2010, Kairosoft found itself a large hit, which reached the top ten in iPhone app sales in its first week. Kairosoft continued to port over games that it had previously developed for other platforms. Pocket Gamer ranked Kairosoft 30th on its "top 50 developers of 2012" list, calling Kairosoft games a "genre in their own right" but noting that they still were mostly a niche in the market.

List of Kairosoft's English games for WildTangent

List of mobile games available in English

 8-Bit Farm
 Anime Studio Story
 Basketball Club Story
 Beastie Bay
 Biz Builder Delux
 Bonbon Cakery
 Boxing Gym Story
 Burger Bistro Story
 Cafeteria Nipponica
 Convenience Stories
 Dream House Days
 Dream Park Story
 Dream Town Story
 Dungeon Village
 Dungeon Village 2
 Epic Astro Story
 Fish Pond Park
 Forest Camp Story
 Forest Golf Planner
 Game Dev Story
 Grand Prix Story
 Grand Prix Story 2
 High Sea Saga
 Home Run High
 Hot Springs Story
 Hot Springs Story 2
 Jumbo Airport Story
 Kairobotica
 Kingdom Adventurers
 Legends of Heropolis
 Magazine Mogul
 Magicians Saga
 March to a Million
 Mega Mall Story
 Mega Mall Story 2
 Ninja Village
 Oh! Edo Towns
 Pocket Academy
 Pocket Academy Zero
 Pocket Arcade Story
 Pocket Clothier
 Pocket Harvest
 Pocket League Story
 Pocket League Story 2
 Pocket Stables
 Pool Slide Story
 Quest Town Saga
 Shiny Ski Resort
 Silver screen story
 Skyforce Unite!
 Social Dev Story
 Station Manager
 Tennis Club Story
 The Manga Works
 The Pyraplex
 The Ramen Sensei
 The Ramen Sensei 2
 The Sushi Spinnery
 Thrift Store Story
 Venture Towns
 Wild Park Manager
 World Cruise Story

List of computer games available in English

List of untranslated games

Mobile
 Departure!! Shipping Freighter (Keitai only)
 Dragging Cat Rebel 
 Excitement! Manga Dojo (iOS and Keitai only)
 Friends Entertainment Building
 Game Center Club
 Good Ramen Museum ~National Hen~
 Manga Path
 Million March (Keitai only)
 Munch Munch Kairo-kun
 Outdoor Excavation Company (Keitai only)
 Piko Piko! Game Expo (Keitai only)
 Prestigious Pocket Academy 1 (Android and Keitai only)
 Royal Gallery Academy (Keitai only)
 Social Game Dev Dream (Android and Keitai only)
 Start!! Hero Base
 Wai Wai! Game Dealer (iOS and Keitai only)
 Witch Quest

PC
 Bookstore Story
 Game Developing Countries
 Game Developing Countries II DX
 The Narrow Path to Manga
 The Secondhand-book Store
 The Secondhand-book Store 2

References

External links
 
 Kairosoft's original website, with PC game downloads 

Software companies based in Tokyo
Japanese companies established in 1996
Video game companies established in 1996
Video game companies of Japan
Video game development companies